John Henry Palin (1870 – 22 May 1934) was a British trades unionist and Labour Party politician.

By the early twentieth century, he was active in the trade union movement in Bradford, Yorkshire. He was a member of the executive of the Amalgamated Society of Railway Servants (ASRS) in 1901 and 1902, and in 1905 he was the Bradford branch secretary of the Amalgamated Association of Tramway and Vehicle Workers In 1910 he was the President of the Bradford Trades and Labour Council. He was also an Independent Labour Party member of Bradford City Council.

In 1912 he was approved as a Labour Party candidate for the next general election, although he was not allocated to any constituency. In 1911 the ASRS nominated him to contest Bradford East. However, the anticipated general election was delayed until 1918 due to the First World War.

At the 1918 general election he unsuccessfully contested Bradford North. He finally succeeded in being elected to the Commons at the 1924 general election, when he was returned as Member of Parliament for Newcastle upon Tyne West. He held the seat in 1929, but was defeated when there was a large swing against Labour in 1931.

He was Lord Mayor of Bradford in 1924 - 1925.

References

External links 
 

1870 births
1934 deaths
Independent Labour Party National Administrative Committee members
Labour Party (UK) MPs for English constituencies
Transport and General Workers' Union-sponsored MPs
UK MPs 1929–1931
UK MPs 1924–1929
Mayors of Bradford